The 2004–05 Eastern Michigan Eagles men's basketball team represented Eastern Michigan University during the 2004–05 NCAA Division I men's basketball season. The Eagles, led by fifth year head coach Jim Boone, who was fired at the end of the season. The Eagles played their home games at the Eastern Michigan University Convocation Center and were members of the West Division of the Mid-American Conference. They finished the season 12–18, 5–13 in MAC play. They finished sixth in the MAC West. They were knocked out in the first round of the MAC Tournament by Akron.

Roster
Source:

The team captains were John Bowler, Michael Ross.

Schedule

|-
!colspan=12 style=| Regular season

|-
!colspan=12 style=| 2005 MAC tournament

Awards
MAC Honorable Mention
 John Bowler

Preseason 1st Team All-MAC West Division
John Bowler

E-Club Hall of Fame Inductees
Ben Braun
Harold Simons

MAC Individual Records
Michael Ross- Free Throw Percentage (.854)

Season Highlights 
11/22 vs Arkansas
 Paradise Jam Basketball Tournament Finals
01/01 at Central Michigan
 EMU attempted the most free throws in school history.

References

Eastern Michigan Eagles men's basketball seasons
Eastern Michigan
2004 in sports in Michigan
2005 in sports in Michigan